Dunford Bridge is a remote  hamlet in the civil parish of Dunford, lying northwest of Sheffield in South Yorkshire, England,  from the border with West Yorkshire and  from the border with Derbyshire. Before the Local Government Act 1972 the area covered by South Yorkshire was part of the West Riding of Yorkshire.

The settlement, consisting of a few houses, lies beneath the Winscar Reservoir. Water draining from the moorland around Grains Moss forms small rivers that join together to form the source of the River Don, which feeds into the reservoir.  The reservoir had suffered from leakage for many years, until Yorkshire Water, the reservoir owners, employed a construction company to correct the problem, using £400,000 worth of specialist grouting and artificial membrane.

The eastern end of the Woodhead Tunnel is in the centre of the hamlet.  The site of the former railway station is now a parking area with the old rail line forming the route of the Trans-Pennine Trail.

In 1974 the two terraces of railway cottages at the eastern tunnel portal, comprising 19 houses, were bought by the Lifespan Educational Trust to establish a commune based on the principles of Summerhill School. The Lifespan Community Collective, which set up a registered housing cooperative and in 1976 opened a wholefood shop in Huddersfield (the cooperative was dissolved in 1987). In the 1980s the community launched a worker cooperative in printing and publishing. The community continues today with about 20 residents; it farms according to permaculture principles and produces the quarterly Communes Network magazine.

The Stanhope Arms Public House (former hunting Lodge belonging to the Stanhope Family) was the only public house in the hamlet of Dunford Bridge. The Stanhope Arms closed down in the early 2000s. It was used as a  theatrical and drama training workshop for a short time afterwards but has been a private residence since 2015.

Windle Edge Road leads 1.5 miles southwest from the hamlet to the Woodhead PassA628 and northeast to the B6106 Holmfirth to Penistone road. The A628 gives access westwards to the M67 and Manchester and southeast to the M1 and Sheffield.

Dunford Bridge is a centre for watersports enthusiasts.  It benefits from walkers exploring the Pennine moorland surrounding the hamlet, using it as a base.  There is a car parking area next to the road bridge and further parking along the side of the Winscar Reservoir on Dunford Road, to the north.  The reservoir is used by a local sailing club.

On 15 September 2015 the National Grid announced a plan to bury underground electricity cables and remove overhead pylons from the village.

References

External links

Yorkshire Water - Winscar Reservoir 
Pennine Sailing Club

Hamlets in South Yorkshire
Towns and villages of the Peak District
Geography of the Metropolitan Borough of Barnsley